Oleksandr Nedovyesov and Ivan Sergeyev were the defending champions, but decided not to compete.

Sergey Betov and Alexander Bury won the title, defeating Shonigmatjon Shofayziyev and Vaja Uzakov in the final, 6–4, 6–3.

Seeds

Draw

Draw

References 
 Main Draw

Samarkand Challengerandnbsp;- Doubles
2014 Doubles